

Trademarks 

The terms "XTRI" and derivatives are owned by XTRI World Tour AS, Norway. These terms are not generic descriptions of Extreme, or Xtreme triathlon but are registered and protected trademarks.

Definition 

Extreme (or Xtreme) Triathlon refers to a type of triathlon competition where competitors race over distances broadly equivalent to those of an Ironman triathlon (3.8k swim, 180k bike, 42k run). They are by definition held over more extreme courses and potentially more extreme conditions due to the remote locations and large elevation changes.

The original Extreme Triathlon was the Norseman Xtreme Triathlon  first held in 2003. Many other races have followed on from this and in 2012 the concept of "AllXTRI was launched" as a global brand that encompassed Norseman along with Celtman and Swissman. This evolved into what is now known as the XTRI World Tour® although many other non-affiliated races of similar format exist around the world, falling under the general term of extreme triathlon. In 2019 Norseman hosted the first XTRI® World Championship in Extreme Triathlon which athletes are eligible for by qualification at the previous year's XTRI World Tour® partner races. 

The number of participants is limited (usually to 250, sometimes less) and some races operate a ballot entry system due to high demand for slots. Many athletes have tried and failed to gain entry to some races over many years. These small numbers allow races to be held in remote and inaccessible locations which is a defining characteristic of extreme triathlon.  

Races are predominantly "unsupported" so competitors need to have personal back up crews that support them with cars to provide them with food and drink. The support crews also often need to accompany their competitor on any potentially dangerous mountain sections. During these sections, competitors are often required to carry a backpack containing emergency food and clothing should the weather change.

Course formats 

One of the defining aspects of extreme triathlon is that the courses are typically far more challenging than a typical long distance and can be longer.

Swims often incorporate colder water temperatures than would not be permitted in a normal race and the smaller number of competitors allows swims to be conducted from much more remote or inaccessible locations including deep water starts accessed by boats and challenging point to point courses.

The cycle sections can be in excess of 200k to fit remote roads and may contain several thousand meters of ascent. They are frequently point to point and participants require a support team to follow them throughout.

Extreme triathlon runs can vary in length. Whilst the Norseman course has been officially accredited as marathon distance, other courses may be a little less or more. They all have a large component of often challenging and technical off road running with some courses being almost entirely off road. They also typically have a large amount of elevation gain, sometimes more than the cycle sections and a number have mountain finishes.

Extreme triathlon communities & activities 

Many extreme triathlon races created Facebook groups to allow their athletes to plan and discuss races. Some of these are relatively open format, and some set up with a closed audience related to specific athletes in specific years.

In late 2019, a 'Global Extreme Triathlon Forum' Facebook group and 'Global Extreme Triathlon Club' on Strava were also set up to create a community across all extreme triathlon races worldwide, and also help nurture aspiring athletes. This has been successfully growing ever since.

COVID in 2020 impacted races globally. All early extreme triathlon races were cancelled or postponed, but some later races managed to convene due to their format of being small in more remote locations. In this backdrop, Norseman and also the XTRI World Tour® created MyXTRI® virtual challenges where athletes completed 'events' wherever they could, or on Zwift (or similar) if unable to get outside.

World Championship in Extreme Triathlon 

The "Grand Finale" of Extreme Triathlon, or the XTRI® World Championship takes place at Norseman each August. Every official XTRI® World Tour race is a qualifier for the championship, giving 4 slots (1st 2 male, 1st 2 female) to be on the start line in Eidfjord.

World Rankings 

The current Extreme Triathlon World rankings for 2022 are as follows:

Women:
 Eilidh PRISE (GBR)
 Kaja Bergwitz-Larsen (NOR)
 Hannah SAITCH (GBR)
Men:
 Jon Sæverås Breivold - NOR
 Kristian Grue - NOR
 Allan Hovda - NOR

Active Race catalogue

SOLO POINT FIVE Race catalogue

Historic Race catalogue

References

External links
 
 
 
 

Triathlon competitions